Mark Matthews (born January 27, 1990) is a professional lacrosse player for the Saskatchewan Rush in the National Lacrosse League.

Canadian Lacrosse Association career
Matthews played for the OLA Jr A Whitby Warriors for three years, winning a Minto Cup in 2011. In 2010 he played for the Coquitlam Adanacs, where he won his first Minto Cup. Matthews currently plays for the Peterborough Lakers in the Major Series Lacrosse league.

College career
Matthews played for the University of Denver for four years. Matthews made the USILA All-American team his junior and senior seasons. With Matthews leading the team in scoring, the Denver Pioneers surprised the lacrosse world by reaching the 2011 NCAA lacrosse semi-finals.

NLL career
Matthews was drafted by the Edmonton Rush in the first round of the 2012 NLL Entry Draft. After scoring 38 goals and 31 assists in his rookie year, Matthews was named NLL Rookie of the Year.
The Rush won their first championship on June 5, 2015, and Matthews was named MVP of the championship finals.  In 2018, Matthews won the National Lacrosse League MVP Award after a year where he broke the league record for assists in a season with 84.

Heading into the 2023 NLL season, Inside Lacrosse ranked Matthews the #10 best forward in the NLL.

MLL career
Matthews was drafted in the first round of the 2012 Major League Lacrosse draft by the Denver Outlaws, where he scored 19 goals in 9 games.  In 2013, he joined the New York Lizards, where he had 11 goals in 8 games. He switched teams again for the 2014 season, this time to the Rochester Rattlers. In his two years there, he played in 8 games and scored 17 goals. In 2016, for the Atlanta Blaze, Matthews has his career high goals with 23. He stayed with the Blaze for the 2017 season, where he had 13 goals in 6 games. In 2018, Matthews joined the Ohio Machine, but only participated in 2 games for them.

Statistics

University of Denver

(a) all-time career points leader for University of Denver

NLL
Reference:

Major League Lacrosse

Canadian Lacrosse Association

Accomplishments
 2010 Minto Cup Champion (Coquitlm Adanacs)
 2011 Minto Cup Champion (Whitby Warriors)
 2015 NLL Champions Cup (Edmonton Rush)
 2016 NLL Champions Cup (Saskatchewan Rush)
 2018 NLL Cup (Saskatchewan Rush)
 2018 NLL MVP (Saskatchewan Rush)

Awards

See also
Denver Pioneers men's lacrosse
2011 NCAA Division I Men's Lacrosse Championship

References

1990 births
Living people
Canadian lacrosse players
Edmonton Rush players
Lacrosse people from Ontario
Major League Lacrosse players
National Lacrosse League major award winners
Saskatchewan Rush players
Sportspeople from Oshawa